Edmund "Paule" Roßmann (11 January 1918 – 4 April 2005) was a Nazi Germany Luftwaffe fighter ace during World War II. He was credited with 93 aerial victories achieved in 640 combat missions, among the numerous ground attack missions. A flying ace or fighter ace is a military aviator credited with shooting down five or more enemy aircraft during aerial combat. He is also noted as being an early mentor of Erich Hartmann, history's leading fighter ace.

Career
Unteroffizier "Paule" Roßmann was transferred to 7. Staffel (7th squadron) of Jagdgeschwader 52 (JG 52—52nd Fighter Wing) on 1 March 1940. At the time, 7. Staffel was commanded by Oberleutnant Herbert Ferner. The Staffel was subordinated to III. Gruppe (3rd group) of JG 52 headed by Major Wolf-Heinrich von Houwald. The Gruppe had been formed on 1 March 1940 at Strausberg and was equipped with the Messerschmitt Bf 109 E-1 and E-3. On 6 April, the Gruppe was moved to Mannheim-Sandhofen Airfield where it was placed under the control of the Stab (headquarter unit) of Jagdgeschwader 53 (JG 53–53rd Fighter Wing). On 1 July, III. Gruppe transferred from Jever Airfield to Werneuchen. According to Mathews and Foreman, Roßmann filed claim for an unconfirmed aerial victory over an unknown type of aircraft that day. This claim is not listed by Barbas nor by Prien, Stemmer, Rodeike and Bock.

Roßmann participated in the Battle of France and Battle of Britain. He was credited with six aerial victories in the western theatre.

In defense of Germany's southeastern borders, with its primary objective defending the oil fields and refineries at Ploiești, Romania, the Luftwaffenmission Rumänien (Luftwaffe Mission Romania) was created. On 15 October, the Stab and 9. Staffel of III. Gruppe of JG 52 were sent to Bucharest Pipera Airfield, followed by 7. And 8. Staffel in late November. There, the III. Gruppe of JG 52 temporarily became the I. Gruppe of Jagdgeschwader 28 (JG 28—28th Fighter Wing). On 4 January 1941, the Gruppe again became the III. Gruppe of JG 52. On 25 May, III. Gruppe was sent to Greece where it was subordinated to Jagdgeschwader 77 (JG 77—77th Fighter Wing) and fought in the Battle of Crete.

War against the Soviet Union
Following its brief deployment in the Balkan Campaign, III. Gruppe was back in Bucharest by mid-June. There, the unit was again subordinated to the Luftwaffenmission Rumänien and reequipped with the new, more powerful Bf 109F-4 model. On 21 June, the Gruppe was ordered to Mizil in preparation of Operation Barbarossa, the German invasion of the Soviet Union. Its primary objective was to provide fighter protection for the oil fields and refineries at Ploiești. Prior to the invasion, Major Gotthard Handrick was replaced by Major Albert Blumensaat as commander of III. Gruppe. Blumensaat was then replaced by Hauptmann Hubertus von Bonin on 1 October. At the time, von Bonin was still in convalescence so that Hauptmann Franz Höring, the commander of 9. Staffel, was also made the acting Gruppenkommandeur (group commander).

By the end of 1941 he had accumulated 32 aerial victories. On 19 March 1942, Roßmann and fellow JG 52 pilot Leutnant Adolf Dickfeld were awarded the Knight's Cross of the Iron Cross. From March to June 1942, he was posted to Ergänzungs-Jagdgruppe Ost as fighter pilot instructor and returned to his Staffel afterwards. Nevertheless, he almost doubled his score by the end of 1942 and claimed his 80th victory on 29 November 1942. At the time, he was an early mentor of Erich Hartmann, history's leading fighter ace.

Roßmann successfully landed his Messerschmitt Bf 109 G-6 (Werknummer 20154—factory number) next to Lohberg's aircraft. At this moment, the Soviet infantry arrived, while Lohberg was shot, Roßmann was taken prisoner of war.

Summary of career

Aerial victory claims
According to US historian David T. Zabecki, Roßmann was credited with 93 aerial victories. Spick also lists Roßmann with 93 aerial victories claimed in approximately 640 combat missions. This figure includes 87 aerial victories on the Eastern Front, and further six victories over the Western Allies. Mathews and Foreman, authors of Luftwaffe Aces — Biographies and Victory Claims, researched the German Federal Archives and found records for 93 aerial victory claims, plus six further unconfirmed claims. All of his confirmed aerialvitories were claimed on the Eastern Front.

Victory claims were logged to a map-reference (PQ = Planquadrat), for example "PQ 44457". These sectors were then subdivided into 36 smaller units to give a location area 3 × 4 km in size.

Awards
 Iron Cross 2nd and 1st class
 Honor Goblet of the Luftwaffe on 17 November 1942 as Unteroffizier and pilot
 German Cross in Gold on 22 January 1942 as Feldwebel in the III./Jagdgeschwader 52
 Knight's Cross of the Iron Cross on 19 March 1942 as Feldwebel and pilot in the 7./Jagdgeschwader 52

Notes

References

Citations

Bibliography

 
 
 
 
 
 
 
 
 
 
 
 
 
 
 
 
 
 
 
 
 
 

1918 births
2005 deaths
People from Greiz (district)
People from the Principality of Reuss-Gera
Luftwaffe pilots
German World War II flying aces
Recipients of the Gold German Cross
Recipients of the Knight's Cross of the Iron Cross
German prisoners of war in World War II held by the Soviet Union
Military personnel from Thuringia